Babasaheb Neelkanth Kalyani is an Indian businessman who served as the chairman and managing director of Bharat Forge, the Flagship company of the Kalyani Group and the world's second-largest forgings manufacturer after ThyssenKrupp of Germany.

Early life and education
Babasaheb Kalyani was born in a lingayat family on 7 January 1949 to Mrs. Sulochana and Mr. Neelakanth Kalyani, a Pune-based technocrat and maker of automotive components. He completed his high school from Rashtriya Military School, Belgaum; and also attended Dr.(Mrs)Erin N.Nagarvala School (formerly National Model School), Pune. He attended BITS Pilani, from where he earned a BE (Hons.) in     Mechanical Engineering in 1970, and later Massachusetts Institute of Technology where he earned an MS degree.

Career
Baba Kalyani joined Bharat Forge, a global manufacturing company, in 1972.

To contribute to a clean and emission-free environment, Kalyani set up Kenersys Limited to manufacture various energy-efficient wind turbines for domestic and international markets. The company also has its own wind turbines in Maharashtra which generate "green energy" for the group's manufacturing operations. He is also engaged in developing solar energy equipment for the non-conventional energy sector. In a joint venture with KPIT Cummins, Bharat Forge is developing a hybrid solution that would contribute in the country being able to meet its vehicular emission targets.

In SKF board of directors member since 2011.

Kalyani received the Indian government's Padma Bhushan award for contributions to Trade and Industry, and was made Commander First Class of the Royal Order of the Polar Star by the Swedish government in recognition of his contribution in furthering trade and business cooperation between Sweden and India. Other awards include Global Economy Prize, 2009 for Business by Kiel Institute, German Businessman of the Year, 2006 by Business India Magazine, Entrepreneur of the Year 2005 for Manufacturing by Ernst & Young, and CEO of the Year 2004 by the Business Standard group.

Government of India constituted a task force under the chairmanship of Baba Kalyani to study policies related to special economic zone (SEZ) on 6 June 2018.

On 19 February 2015, the Kalyani Group announced a joint venture with Rafael Advanced Defense Systems of Israel. This joint venture company will be based in India.

In April 2021, Forbes estimated his net worth to be around US$2.3 billion.

Philanthropy

He is the founder-chairman of Pratham Pune Education Foundation, an NGO that is engaged in providing primary education to children belonging to under-privileged sections of the local community, which was established in 2000.

References

External links

 Kalyani Group web site
 Forbes list

1949 births
Living people
Businesspeople from Maharashtra
Recipients of the Padma Bhushan in trade and industry
Recipients of the Order of Merit of the Federal Republic of Germany